Bumbu (also known as bumbo or bumboo) is a drink made from rum, water, sugar, and nutmeg. Cinnamon is sometimes substituted for or added to the nutmeg. Modern bumbo is often made with dark rum, citrus juice, grenadine, and nutmeg.

A related drink is the Traitor, made with orange juice, rum, honey, and cactus, mixed and heated.

Bumbu was commonly used during election campaigns in colonial British America, to the extent that treating voters to gifts and other freebies during election campaigns was referred to as "swilling the planters with bumbu". George Washington was particularly noted for using this technique. His papers state that he used 160 gallons of rum to treat 391 voters to bumbu during campaigning for the Virginia House of Burgesses in July 1758.

References 

Caribbean cuisine
Cocktails with rum